Paradise Highway is a 2022 thriller film written and directed by Anna Gutto and starring Juliette Binoche, Frank Grillo, and Morgan Freeman. An international co-production between the United States, Germany, and Switzerland, the film was released in the United States on July 29, 2022, by Lionsgate.

Cast
Juliette Binoche as Sally
Frank Grillo as Dennis
Morgan Freeman as Gerick
Hala Finley as Leila
Cameron Monaghan as FBI Special Agent Finley Sterling
Christiane Seidel as Claire
Veronica Ferres as Rose
Desiree Wood as Pattie
Dianne McNair-Smith as 	Dolly
Walker Babington as Terrence
Jwaundace Candece as Tesia
Jackie Dallas as Deborah
Jim Dougherty as Paul

Production
Filming occurred in Jackson and Clarksdale, Mississippi, in July 2021. Filming also took place in Brookhaven, Mississippi.

As of August 2021, the film was in post-production. In October 2021, it was announced that Lionsgate acquired North American distribution rights to the film.

Release
The film was released in theaters and on-demand in the United States on July 29, 2022, by Lionsgate. The film was also shown at the Locarno Festival in August 2022.

Reception

Critical response
On Rotten Tomatoes, the film holds an approval rating of 17% based on 18 reviews, with an average rating of 5.4/10. It has an approval rating of 48 out of a 100 based on 5 reviews on Metacritic, indicating "mixed to average reviews".

Joe Leydon of Variety called the film "A shrewdly constructed melodrama that does not transcend cliches and conventions so much as show how useful and effective they can be in the right hands". Robert Daniels of RogerEbert.com wrote: "Paradise Highway is the kind wayward, tonally muddled project an actress the caliber of Binoche would only sign onto if promises were broken and payback was required". The New York Timess Concepción de León had this to say about Paradise Highway: "Though it is refreshing to see members of law enforcement focused on recovering and supporting a victim rather than pursuing her abusers, it does not allow for much narrative tension".

References

External links

2022 thriller films
2020s English-language films
American thriller films
English-language German films
English-language Swiss films
Films about the Federal Bureau of Investigation
Films about human trafficking in the United States
Films set in Arkansas
Films set in Mississippi
Films set in Tennessee
Films shot in Mississippi
German thriller films
Lionsgate films
Swiss thriller films
Trucker films
2020s American films